The Cross County Trail is a multi-use trail located in Plymouth Township, Montgomery County, Pennsylvania.
Once complete, it will connect to the Power Line Trail and the Wissahickon Green Ribbon Trail.

References

External links
 Cross County Trail Web Site

Rail trails in Pennsylvania
Bike paths in Pennsylvania
Protected areas of Montgomery County, Pennsylvania